This is a list of notable people associated with San Diego State University, a California State University campus located in the United States.

Alumni

Entertainment, arts, and media 

 Lloyd Bryan Molander Adams, executive producer, channel executive and director
 K.D. Aubert, supermodel, model, actress and Fantanas member
 David Hasemyer, Pulitzer Prize winning journalist; B.A. Journalism 1979
 John Baldessari, conceptual artist; B.A., 1953; M.A., 1957
 Greg Bear, science fiction author; B.A. English, 1973
 Cleveland Berto, actor
 Jesse Billauer, quadriplegic, motivational speaker, surfer; B.A. Communications, 2002
Luke Brugnara, businessman, casino mogul.
 Brian Patrick Butler, actor and filmmaker
 Russell Carpenter, cinematographer of Titanic; B.A. English, 1972
 Dan Corson, artist; B.A. Theater, 1986
 Erika De La Cruz, television host and media personality for Fashion Week; B.A. Film and Fashion
 Amy Devers, furniture designer and TV personality (Freeform Furniture, Designer People, Trading Spaces, Home Made Simple); B.A. Furniture Design, 1997
 DJ Rectangle, DJ/turntablist and Grammy Award-nominated dance/hip hop/club record producer; B.B.A.
 Fred Dryer, actor-producer and former NFL player
 Manny MUA, YouTuber; B.A., 2013
 Faye Emerson, actress
 Sid Fleischman, author of children's books and screenplays; B.A. English
 Matt Flynn, drummer of Maroon 5 (attended briefly)
 Courtney Friel, television host; B.A. Political Science, 2002
 Vic Fuentes, lead singer of Pierce the Veil
 Ted Giannoulas, The San Diego Chicken
 Bob Goen, media personality and Entertainment Tonight anchor-correspondent; B.A. Telecommunications and Film, 1976
 Mark Grace, long time Chicago Cubs first baseman, current color analyst for the Arizona Diamondbacks and Fox Sports
 Justin Halpern, author; B.A., 2003
 Crystal Harris, model
 Fred Holle, fine art painter and educator
 Brion James, actor
 Darren Kavinoky, lawyer, TV personality
 Julie Kavner, actress; voice of Marge Simpson, The Simpsons; B.A. Drama, 1971
 Kathleen Kennedy, film producer; B.A. Telecommunications and Film, 1976
 Cassandra Kunze, 2014 Miss California USA
 George Lewis, NBC Nightly News correspondent
 Joe Liggins, R&B musician who wrote and recorded "The Honeydripper"
 Jim Lindberg, lead singer of punk band Pennywise (band) (attended briefly)
Art Linkletter (1912–2010), veteran entertainer; B.A. Teaching, 1934
 Cleavon Little, actor; B.A. Drama
 Peter Menefee, costume- and stage-designer
 Abby Martin, journalist, RT TV network; 9/11 conspiracy theorist; activist with mediaroots.org; B.A. Political Science, 2006
 David McKenna, writer, "American History X"
 Adam Montoya, Internet celebrity, known as SeaNanners; B.A., 2006
 Kathy Najimy, actress; voice of Peggy Hill on King of the Hill
 Gregory Peck, actor
 Lisa Dergan Podsednik, model
 Zach Porter, lead singer of pop band Allstar Weekend
 Andy Rathbone, author of ...for Dummies books, technology writer; B.A. Literature, 1986
 Constance Reid, author of several biographies of mathematicians and popular books about mathematics; B.A. 1938
Michael Matteo Rossi, Filmmaker
 Marion Ross, TV actress (Happy Days)
 Marisa Scheinfeld, photographer; M.F.A., 2011
 Whitney Shay, blues singer, 2008
 Tammie Souza, television meteorologist; B.S. Biology
 Suzy Spafford, cartoonist, creator of "Suzy's Zoo"; B.F.A., 1957
 J. Michael Straczynski, writer; B.A. Psychology and Sociology, 1976
 Susanna Thompson, actress; B.A. Drama, 1980
 Salvador Torres, artist and muralist, father of the Chicano Park murals; M.A. Painting and Drawing, 1973
 Joan D. Vinge, author; B.A., 1971
 Alison Waite, model
Carl Weathers, actor/former professional football player, Apollo Creed in Rocky
 Don Weeke, fiber and gourd artist, M.S.W, 1976 
 Raquel Welch, actress
 Steve Yuhas, radio broadcaster and television personality
 Jeanne Zelasko, sports journalist, Fox Sports
 Saweetie, rapper. Saweetie attended SDSU for two years before transferring to the University of Southern California

Business 
 Charles Brandes, founder of Brandes Investment Partners; B.A. Economics, 1965
 Norman E. Brinker, founder of Steak & Ale, former president of Jack in the Box, restaurateur innovator; B.S. Management 1957
 Adelia Coffman, founding CFO of Qualcomm Incorporated; B.S. Accounting 1976
 Bill Davis, former president of the Universal Orlando Resort; B.S. Marketing, 1980
 Vince Ferraro, Senior General Management and Marketing Executive, ExecRank's 2012 list of top 50 CMOs; B.S. Business Administration 
 Van Arsdale France, '34, founding employee training manager at Disneyland, co-creator of "Disney University"
 Maruta Gardner, American educator and community activist; M.S. Administration and Supervision 1976
 Rick Hamada CEO of Avnet; B.S. Finance 1982
 Chris R. Hansen, hedge fund manager, unsuccessfully tried to lure the Sacramento Kings to Seattle in 2013
 Nik Ingersöll, American entrepreneur and designer.
 W. Craig Jelinek, President and chief executive officer of Costco.
 Peggy Johnson, former Executive Vice President of Qualcomm, former Executive Vice President of Business Development at Microsoft, current CEO of Magic Leap; B.S. Electrical Engineering
 Doug Manchester, real estate developer, namesake of Manchester Grand Hyatt Hotel in San Diego, publisher of the San Diego Union Tribune; B.S. Finance 1965
 Robert O. Peterson, founder of Jack in the Box
 Sol Price, founder of Price Club (later merged with Costco); B.A. Philosophy 1936
 S. Donley Ritchey, former CEO and President of Lucky Stores and current director of The McClatchy Company; B.S. Accounting 1955, M.S. Management 1963
 Jim Sinegal, Costco Chief Executive Officer, named to Time Magazines 2006 list of The 100 most influential people; B.A. 1959
 James M. Sweeney, founder and former CEO, CareMark, Inc. (now CVS CareMark), B.S. 1969
 Russell Weiner, founder RockStar Energy Drink; B.A. Political Science 1992
 Mike Wells, Prudential plc Chief Executive Officer

Science 
 Belle Benchley, Director of San Diego Zoo from 1927 to 1953
 Samuel Kounaves, professor of chemistry at Tufts University
 Joan Bybee, PhD (at UCLA), linguist; M.A. Linguistics 
 Laurance Doyle, PhD  (at Heidelberg University), SETI astronomer; M.S. Astronomy
 Jacques Gauthier, PhD (at UCB), Paleotonlogist and Professor at Yale University and Peabody Museum of Natural History; B.S. Zoology 1973, M.S. Biological Science 1980
 Arthur Jensen, PhD (at Columbia University), Professor Emeritus of educational psychology at University of California, Berkeley; M.A. Psychology 1952
 M. Brian Maple, PhD (at UCSD), professor of physics at University of California, San Diego; B.S. Physics 1963
 Gordon Eugene Martin, MA, pioneering piezoelectric materials researcher for underwater sound transducers
 Bridgette Meinhold, M.S. (from Stanford University), artist and author with a focus on sustainability; B.S. Mechanical Engineering 2003
 Ellen Ochoa, PhD (from Stanford University), first Latina astronaut; B.S. Physics 1980
 Mark M. Phillips, PhD (from UC Santa Cruz), US astronomer and cosmologist, Gruber Prize Laureate of 2007 for the discovery of Dark Energy and the Accelerating Universe, member of the High-Z Supernova Search Team; B.S. Astronomy 1973
 Bernard Rimland, PhD, autism researcher and founder of the Autism Society of America; M.S. Psychology
 J. Michael Scott, PhD (from Oregon State University), biologist and ornithologist; M.S. Marine Biology
 Gina Simmons Schneider, PhD, psychoanalyst, writer; B.A. Psychology 1983
 Robert Titzer, professor and infant researcher; teaching certificate
 Paul J. Zak, Professor and founder of the Neuroscience as a Service (NaaS) platform Immersion

Politics and government 

 Muhammed Al-Jasser, PhD. (at UCR), Saudi Arabian economist who served as the Minister of Economy and Planning and Chairman of Saudi Telecom; B.A. Economics 1979
 David Alvarez, San Diego City Council member
 Karen Bass, mayor of Los Angeles
 Roger Benitez, U.S. Federal Judge; B.A., 1974
 Ken Calvert, member of Congress, California; B.A., 1975
 Ammar Campa-Najjar (born 1989), Democratic candidate
 Kevin Faulconer, Mayor of San Diego; B.A. Political Science, 1990
 Dusty Foggo, former CIA official
 Georgette Gomez, San Diego City Council member
 Mike Gotch, California State Assemblyman and San Diego City Council member
 Shirley Horton, Assemblywoman 2002–2008
Duncan D. Hunter, former member of Congress, California; convicted felon
Brian Jones (born 1968), politician serving in the California State Senate
 Steven T. Kuykendall, former member of Congress, California; M.B.A., 1974
 Bill Lowery, lobbyist and former member of Congress
 Mark Meckler, political activist
 Rodney Melville, US judge
 Mary Salas, CA State Assemblywoman
 Lori Saldana, CA State Assemblywoman
 Jerry Sanders, former mayor of San Diego, former Chief of Police
Glenn E. Trowbridge (born 1943), Republican member of the Nevada Assembly. 
 Howard Wayne, Assemblyman 1996–2002
 Bob Wilson, former member of Congress, namesake of Bob Wilson Naval Hospital

Athletics and sports 

Dakarai Allen, professional basketball player
Greg Allen, Cleveland Indians Outfielder
Rob Awalt, former NFL tight end
Marcelo Balboa, World Cup and MLS soccer star
Steven Beitashour, MLS All-Star Soccer, player for San Jose Earthquakes
Bud Black, former Major League Baseball pitcher and former manager of the San Diego Padres; B.S. Management 1979
Greg Boyd, former NFL defensive end
Vincent Brown, wide receiver for the San Diego Chargers
Willie Buchanon, former NFL cornerback
Michael Cage, former NBA player
Joe Corona, soccer player, Club Tijuana Xoloitzcuintles de Caliente and United States men's national soccer team
Don Coryell, former NCAA and NFL head coach, member of the College Football Hall of Fame
Zylan Cheatham, New Orleans Pelicans forward.
Isaac Curtis, former NFL wide receiver
Tom Dahms, former NFL offensive tackle
Brad Daluiso, former NFL placekicker
Gordon Dallas, North American Soccer League player
Kerwin Danley, Major League Baseball umpire
Jeff DaVanon, MLB baseball player
Vernon Dean, former NFL cornerback
Will Demps, former NFL safety
Mike Douglass, former NFL linebacker
Fred Dryer, former NFL defensive end, actor
William Dunkle, offensive guard for the Pittsburgh Steelers
Herm Edwards, former Kansas City Chiefs head coach
Gavin Escobar, Dallas Cowboys tight end
Brett Faryniarz, former NFL linebacker
Marshall Faulk, former NFL running back, star of the St. Louis Rams, inducted into the Pro Football Hall of Fame
Roman Fortin, former NFL center
Malachi Flynn, Toronto Raptors guard 
John Fox, football player
Ty France, Seattle Mariners infielder
Donte Gamble, American football player
Gary Garrison, former NFL wide receiver
Kabeer Gbaja-Biamila, former NFL defensive end
Joe Gibbs, former NFL head coach of the Washington Redskins, Hall of Famer, and owner of NASCAR racing team Joe Gibbs Racing
La'Roi Glover, former NFL defensive tackle
Mark Grace, retired Major League Baseball player and World Series Champion
Robert Griffith, former NFL safety
Chris Gwynn, retired Major League Baseball player
Tony Gwynn, Baseball Hall of Famer
Tony Gwynn Jr., Los Angeles Dodgers outfielder
Az-Zahir Hakim, former NFL wide receiver
Tally Hall, goalkeeper for Major League Soccer (MLS)'s Houston Dynamo
Aaron Harang, San Diego Padres pitcher
Doug Harvey, former MLB Umpire and Baseball Hall of Fame Inductee 2010
David Hensley, MLB infielder
Ronnie Hillman, running back for the Denver Broncos

 Alex Hinshaw, San Francisco Giants pitcher
 Marty Hogan (born 1958), racquetball player
 Mike Houghton, former Buffalo Bills guard
 Bob Howard, former NFL cornerback
 Joe Jackson, gridiron football player
 Monte Jackson, former NFL cornerback
 Terry Jackson, former NFL cornerback
 Freddie Keiaho, current NFL linebacker for the Indianapolis Colts and Super Bowl XLI Champion
 Armen Keteyian, sports journalist, HBO Sports, Real Sports with Bryant Gumbel
 Mike Kozlowski, former NFL safety
 Joel Kramer  (b. 1955), basketball player
 Joe Lavender, former NFL cornerback
 Travis Lee, former Major League Baseball player
 Jeanne Lenhart, senior Olympian, volleyball player, Ms. Senior San Diego 2012
 Kawhi Leonard, Los Angeles Clippers forward, 2014 & 2019 NBA Finals MVP
 Ilima-Lei Macfarlane (Anthropology 2013), professional Mixed Martial Artist, inaugural and current Bellator MMA Flyweight Champion
 John Madden, former Oakland Raiders head coach, Monday Night Football color commentator
Steve Malovic (1956–2007), American-Israeli basketball player
 Chris Marlowe, sportscaster, former Olympic volleyball player
 Justin Masterson, Cleveland Indians pitcher
 Matt McCoy, current NFL linebacker for the Tampa Bay Buccaneers
 Jalen McDaniels, Charlotte HornetsCenter
 Bobby Meacham, former Major League Baseball player
 Bob Mendoza, Rugby Player of the Year 1967, former Red Sox outfielder
 Claudie Minor, former NFL offensive tackle
 Rich Moran, former NFL punter
 Kirk Morrison, Former Oakland Raiders', Buffalo Bills', and Jacksonville Jaguars' starting linebacker
 Haven Moses, NFL wide receiver
 Kassim Osgood, former NFL wide receiver
Dorian "Doc" Paskowitz (1921–2014), surfer and physician
 Scott Piercy, professional golfer
 Damon Pieri, NFL player
 Chester Pitts, NFL, Houston Texans
 Noel Prefontaine, Toronto Argonauts kicker
 Jimmy Raye, VP of Football Operations for the Indianapolis Colts
 Addison Reed, relief pitcher for the Boston Red Sox
 Benny Ricardo, former NFL placekicker
 Charlene Rink, former professional fitness competitor
Hubert Roberts (born 1961), American-Israeli basketball player
 Arnie Robinson, Olympic long jump gold medalist
 Patrick Rowe, NFL player
 Brian Russell, former NFL safety
 Ephraim Salaam, former NFL offensive tackle
 Mike Saxon, former NFL punter
 Xander Schauffele, Professional Golfer
 Chaz Schilens, NFL wide receiver, formerly with Oakland Raiders, currently with New York Jets
 Darnay Scott, former Cincinnati Bengals wide receiver
 Casey Schmitt, 3rd baseman for the San Francisco Giants
 Brian Sipe, former Cleveland Browns quarterback
 Marcus Slaughter, professional basketball player. 
 Webster Slaughter, former wide receiver
 Dave Smith, former Major League Baseball pitcher
 Jeff Staggs, former NFL linebacker
 Willie Steele, 1948 Olympic long jump gold medalist
 Daniel Steres (born 1990), professional soccer player with the LA Galaxy
 Stephen Strasburg (born 1988), Washington Nationals pitcher
 Malcolm Thomas (born 1988), professional basketball player; currently plays for the Israeli team Maccabi Tel Aviv
 Kyle Turley, former NFL offensive tackle
 Don Warren, former NFL tight end
 Jeff Webb, former Kansas City Chiefs wide receiver
 Ralph Wenzel, former NFL offensive guard
 Jim Wilks, former NFL defensive end
 Nate Wright, former NFL cornerback
 Eric Wynalda, World Cup and MLS soccer player; Fox Sports broadcaster

Military

 Robert Cardenas, retired Brigadier General; B.A. 1972
 Thomas J. Haynes, Air National Guard general
 Merrill McPeak, retired Chief of Staff of the United States Air Force; B.A. Economics, 1957
 William J. Marks, USN Commander, spokesman for the Defense Intelligence Agency; M.A. Mass Communication and Media Studies, 2007
 James E. McPherson, retired Navy officer, former 39th Judge Advocate General of the Navy; Bachelor of Public Administration, 1977
 Donald Erwin Wilson, U.S. Navy admiral; B.S. Accounting, 1954; M.S. Management, 1955

Crime
 Kristin Rossum, toxicologist convicted of the murder of her husband
 Duncan D. Hunter, US Representative plead guilty to conspiracy to misuse campaign funds.

Faculty 
 Joanna Brooks, English professor
 Jerry Farber, author, professor
 Larry McCaffery, writer, editor, post-modern literary critic, professor
 Khaleel Mohammed, PhD, professor of religious studies
 Shirley Weber, PhD, founding faculty and department chair, SDSU Department of Africana Studies

Retired and former faculty 
 Nathalia Crane, poet, deceased professor of English
 Thomas B. Day, physicist, deceased president of SDSU from 1978 to 1996
 Suzette Haden Elgin, author, retired linguistics professor
 Clinton Jencks, PhD, retired professor of Economics
 Lev Kirshner, soccer player and soccer coach
 Noel Loomis, science fiction and mystery writer, deceased English instructor
 John V. Pavlik, founding director of the SDSU School of Communication
 Anna Prieto Sandoval, Sycuan Band of the Kumeyaay Nation Chairwoman, and teacher of the Kumeyaay language
 Vernor Vinge, PhD, science fiction writer and visionary, retired professor of mathematics
 Joy Zedler, ecologist and botanist, founder of SDSU Pacific Estuarine Research Laboratory

References

San Diego State University
San Diego State University people
San Diego State University